Ivana Rádlová (born June 12, 1968) is a Czechoslovakian cross-country skier who competed in the late 1980s. She finished seventh in the 4 × 5 km relay at the 1988 Winter Olympics in Calgary.

Cross-country skiing results

Olympic Games

External links
Women's 4 × 5 km cross-country relay Olympic results: 1976–2002 

1968 births
Cross-country skiers at the 1988 Winter Olympics
Czech female cross-country skiers
Living people
Czechoslovak skiers